The name Hope has been used for five tropical cyclones worldwide, one in the Atlantic Ocean and four in the Western Pacific Ocean.

In the Atlantic:
Tropical Storm Hope (1978) – remained over the open ocean

In the Western  Pacific:
Typhoon Hope (1976) – churned out at sea
Typhoon Hope (1979) (09W, Ising, 3B) – Category 4 super typhoon, brushed Taiwan then struck southern China; subsequently restrengthened to a severe tropical storm in the Bay of Bengal
Tropical Storm Hope (1982) (Pasing) – struck Vietnam
Typhoon Hope (1985) (Unsing) – threatened Luzon but turned north and eastward out to sea